Hanönü District is a district of the Kastamonu Province of Turkey. Its seat is the town of Hanönü. Its area is 417 km2, and its population is 4,134 (2021).

Composition
There is one municipality in Hanönü District:
 Hanönü

There are 20 villages in Hanönü District:

 Akçasu
 Bağdere
 Bölükyazı
 Çakırçay
 Çaybaşı
 Demircimüezzin
 Gökbelen
 Gökçeağaç
 Halkabük
 Hocavakıf
 Kavakköy
 Kayabaşı
 Küreçayı
 Sarıalan
 Sirkeköy
 Yeniboyundurcak
 Yenice
 Yeniköy
 Yılanlı
 Yukarıçakırçayı

References

Districts of Kastamonu Province